Sagarat is a place in the Amhara Region of Ethiopia, near Dessie. It is part of the Dessie Zuria woreda and is very close to Kutaber town and Boru Selassie Church to one side. It faces the amba of Miderwasha (on top of which the Church of Saint George is found) in Ambassel. The churches of Sagart Mikael in Sagarat and Miderwasha Giyorgis in Ambassel face each other, the former from the western side and the later from eastern side of the valley of Esmano, which marks the border between the two woredas.

Tradition has it that Emperor Yekuno Amlak of Ethiopia as a young boy was educated in Lake Hayq's Istafanos Church (located in Ambassel), which later became a monastery after he became Emperor of Ethiopia.

History of Ethiopia
Amhara Region